The Greentree Agreement is a formal treaty which resolved the Cameroon–Nigeria border dispute over the oil and natural gas-rich Bakassi peninsula. The dispute had roots as far back as 1913; 1981, 1994, and 1996 armed clashes between Nigeria and Cameroon took place in Bakassi.
The dispute was referred to the International Court of Justice and on 10 October 2002 the ICJ ruled in favor of Cameroon.

On 12 June 2006, Nigerian President Olusegun Obasanjo and Cameroonian President Paul Biya signed the Greentree Agreement concerning the withdrawal of troops and transfer of authority in the peninsula. The withdrawal of Nigerian troops was set for 60 days but allowed for a possible 30-day extension while Nigeria was allowed to keep its civil administration and police in Bakassi for another two years. The dispute between the two states was settled by the International Court of Justice, who ruled in favour of Cameroon. The Nigerian government complied and withdrew its troops, motivated by the risk of losing foreign aid.
 
A follow-up committee, composed of representatives from Cameroon, Nigeria, the UN, Germany, the USA, France and the UK, was created to monitor the implementation of the agreement.

On 13 August 2013, the United Nations Security Council stated that it welcomed the peaceful end two days earlier of the special transitional regime in the Bakassi Peninsula.

References

Treaties of Nigeria
Treaties of Cameroon
Peace treaties
Politics of Nigeria
Politics of Cameroon
Treaties concluded in 2006
Treaties entered into force in 2006
2006 in Nigeria
2006 in Cameroon